Kim Boyce is the debut album by American Christian singer Kim Boyce, released in 1986 on Myrrh Records.The album debuted and peaked at number 29 on the Billboard Top Inspirational Albums chart.

Critical reception
Evan Cater of AllMusic gave the album 2.5 out of 5 stars stating that: "The result is a wildly uneven sugar puff of utterly white-bread synthesized lite pop. A few of the tunes here are catchy enough to obscure the grating qualities of Boyce's frequently shrill vocals. The appealingly minor-key "Darkened Hearts," the effective formula ballad "Here," and -- especially -- the unexpected cover of Alison Moyet's "Love Resurrection" get the album off to a promising start, thanks in large part to the immaculate synthesized sheen of Brian Tankersley's production. But the rest of the album (with the exception of the silly but engaging "Sing and Dance") is almost unbearably flabby."

Track listing

Personnel 
 Kim Boyce – vocals, backing vocals (1, 2, 8)
 James Hollihan – keyboards (1, 4, 8), drum programming (1, 4, 8), arrangements (1, 4, 8), guitars (4, 8)
 Tom Hemby – keyboards (2, 9), guitars (2, 9), drum programming (2, 9), arrangements (2, 9)
 John Andrew Schreiner – keyboards (3, 5), drum programming (3), arrangements (3)
 Paul Mills – additional keyboards (3), keyboards (7)
 Rick Altizer – keyboards (5), drum programming (5), arrangements (5)
 Rhett Lawrence – keyboards (6), drum programming (6), arrangements (6)
 Stewart – guitars (5)
 George Cocchini – guitars (7), drum programming (7)
 John Patitucci – bass (5)
 Bruce Atkinson – fretless bass (9)
 Kirk Whalum – saxophone (1, 4), soprano saxophone (3)
 David Schober – arrangements (5)
 Rick Crawford – backing vocals (1, 3)
 Brian Tankersley – backing vocals (1), drum programming (3), additional drums (7)
 Wayne Watson – backing vocals (1, 3)
 Tim Miner – backing vocals (6)

Production
 Brian Tankersley – producer (1-4, 6-9), engineer (1-4, 6-9), mixing
 Rick Altizer – producer (5)
 David Schober – producer (5), recording (5)
 Rhett Lawrence – co-producer (6)
 Lynn Nichols – mixing 
 J.T. Cantwelll – second engineer 
 Tim Kimsey – second engineer 
 Ron Lagerlof – second engineer 
 Mike Ross – second engineer 
 Clark Schleicher – second engineer 
 Joan Tankersley – art direction, design 
 Moshe Brakha – photography 
 Lori Cooper – graphics
 Lynette Leggott – graphics
 Wendy Rosen – hair, make-up 
 Michael Dixon – management

Charts

Radio singles

References

1986 debut albums
Kim Boyce albums
Myrrh Records albums
Word Records albums